The Balkan–Danubian culture was an early medieval archaeological culture which emerged in the region of the Lower Danube in the 8th century and flourished until the 11th century. In Bulgaria it is usually referred to as the Pliska–Preslav culture, while in Romania it is called the Dridu culture. It is better represented in the territory of modern-day Central and Northern Bulgaria, although it probably spread north of the Danube as well due to the continuous extension of the First Bulgarian Empire over the territory of present-day Romania in Northern Dobrudzha. The Balkan–Danubian culture is described as an early Slavic-Bulgarian culture, but besides Slavic and Bulgar elements it also possesses some Romance components. However, this only appears in the southern regions of what is now southern Bulgaria, all of which were heavily influenced by the Byzantine Empire. Famous examples of this architecture are the early Bulgarian capitals of Pliska and Veliki Preslav, in addition to the Palace of Omurtag and the Murfatlar Cave Complex. Some scholars partition this culture in two subgroups. Because the Byzantine influence was stronger in the south, the northern finds are entirely Slavic with some Turkic impression.

See also
 First Bulgarian Empire
 Golden Age of medieval Bulgarian culture
 Slavic influence on Romanian

Footnotes

Sources

Madgearu, Alexandru (2007). “The Dridu Culture and the changing position of Romania among the Communist states”, Archaeologia Bulgarica, 11-2 (2007): 51-59.

Slavic archaeological cultures
Early medieval archaeological cultures of Europe
Archaeological cultures of Eastern Europe
Archaeological cultures of Southeastern Europe
Archaeological cultures in Bulgaria
Archaeological cultures in Romania
Migration Period
First Bulgarian Empire
Romania in the Early Middle Ages